Macharioch Motte is the remains of a motte-and-bailey castle situated in a field near the farm of Macharioch in Kintyre, Argyll and Bute, Scotland.

See also
 List of castles in Argyll and Bute

References
Anglo-Norman Castles, Robert Liddiard Woodbridge, 2002
http://canmore.org.uk/site/38691/macharioch-farm-motte

Castles in Argyll and Bute